The Hall Islands are a group of two large atolls in the northern part of the state of Chuuk, Federated States of Micronesia. In the broader sense, a third and smaller atoll is included.

Nomwin, the western atoll, and Murilo, the eastern one, are located about 9 km apart, being the emergent parts of a twin-lobed seamount. Murilo and Nomwin each harbor a population of more than 1,000 people. They lie roughly 100 km to the north of Chuuk Lagoon. Uninhabited East Fayu, lying 30+ km to the west of Nomwin, is sometimes included in the Halls. The three atolls together account for a dry surface of about 3.5 km2 over more than 50 islets or motus.

References

Islands of Chuuk State
Atolls of the Federated States of Micronesia